IEEE 802 is a family of Institute of Electrical and Electronics Engineers (IEEE) standards for local area networks (LAN), personal area network (PAN), and metropolitan area networks (MAN). The IEEE 802 LAN/MAN Standards Committee (LMSC) maintains these standards. The IEEE 802 family of standards has had twenty-four members, numbered 802.1 through 802.24, with a working group of the LMSC devoted to each. However, not all of these working groups are currently active.

The IEEE 802 standards are restricted to computer networks carrying variable-size packets, unlike cell relay networks, for example, in which data is transmitted in short, uniformly sized units called cells. Isochronous signal networks, in which data is transmitted as a steady stream of octets, or groups of octets, at regular time intervals, are also outside the scope of the IEEE 802 standards.

The number 802 has no significance: it was simply the next number in the sequence that the IEEE used for standards projects.

The services and protocols specified in IEEE 802 map to the lower two layers (data link and physical) of the seven-layer Open Systems Interconnection (OSI) networking reference model. IEEE 802 divides the OSI data link layer into two sub-layers: logical link control (LLC) and medium access control (MAC), as follows:  
Data link layer
LLC sublayer
MAC sublayer
Physical layer

The most widely used standards are for Ethernet, Bridging and Virtual Bridged LANs, Wireless LAN, Wireless PAN, Wireless MAN, Wireless Coexistence, Media Independent Handover Services, and Wireless RAN.

Working groups

References

IEEE Std 802-1990: IEEE standards for Local and Metropolitan Networks: Overview and Architecture New York:1990

External links
802 Committee website
IEEE 802 Standards available via IEEE Get Program
Entrepreneurial Capitalism and Innovation: A History of Computer Communications 1968-1988 

 
Working groups